Morgan Hill is a mountain in the central part of the state of New York. It is located north-northeast of Truxton in Cortland County with a small portion in Onondaga County. The portion of the mountain within Onondaga County is the highest point in the county.

Much or all of the hill, including its summit, is within Morgan Hill State Forest.

History
In 1940, the Civilian Conservation Corps Camp S-103 of DeRuyter built an  International Derrick steel fire lookout tower on the mountain. Due to increased use of aerial fire detection, the tower ceased fire lookout operation at the end of 1970. The tower was later removed in 1978.

References

Mountains of Cortland County, New York
Mountains of New York (state)